Lalu KV (born 20 November 1987 in Kerala) is an Indian footballer who plays as a defender for FC Kerala in the I-League 2nd Division.

Career

ONGC
He made his debut for the club 8 October 2012 against Pune F.C. in the opening round of the 2012–13 season.

FC Kerala
In 2016–17 Season, Lalu joined FC Kerala, a professional club from Thrissur, Kerala, which plays in Kerala Premier League.

Career statistics

Club
Statistics accurate as of 11 May 2013

References

External links
Profile at i-league.org.

Indian footballers
1987 births
Living people
I-League players
ONGC FC players
F.C. Kerala players
Footballers from Kerala
Association football defenders